10th Lithuanian Police Battalion was a Lithuanian auxiliary police battalion first formed in August 1941 and disbanded in January 31, 1943. The original 10th Battalion is known to have partaken in the Holocaust. A new battalion with the same name was formed after a few months and was renumbered as Schutzmannschaft Battalion 256.

History 
The 10th Schutzmannschaft Battalion was formed in Panevėžys in August 1941. The battalion had a total strength of 280 to 300 men, with three companies each of 80-90 men. It was disbanded on 31 January 1943 and its men absorbed by the 14th Schutzmannschaft Battalion. This battalion took part in the Holocaust.

References

Sources 

Lithuanian Schutzmannschaft Battalions
Military units and formations established in 1941
Military units and formations disestablished in 1943